The men's Greco-Roman middleweight competition at the 1936 Summer Olympics in Berlin took place from 6 August to 9 August at the Deutschlandhalle. Nations were limited to one competitor. This weight class was limited to wrestlers weighing up to 79kg.

This Greco-Roman wrestling competition continued to use the "bad points" elimination system introduced at the 1928 Summer Olympics, with a slight modification. Each round featured all wrestlers pairing off and wrestling one bout (with one wrestler having a bye if there were an odd number). The loser received 3 points if the loss was by fall or unanimous decision and 2 points if the decision was 2-1 (this was the modification from prior years, where all losses were 3 points). The winner received 1 point if the win was by decision and 0 points if the win was by fall. At the end of each round, any wrestler with at least 5 points was eliminated.

Schedule

Results

Round 1

Of the eight bouts, five were won by fall giving the winners 0 points. The three other bouts were by decision, giving the winners 1 point apiece. Seven of the eight losers received 3 points, with Mägi the only losing by split decision and receiving only 2 point.

 Bouts

 Points

Round 2

Six men were eliminated in the eight bouts; the two losers who were not eliminated had started with 0 points and finished the round with 3. Johansson and Schweickert were the only two wrestlers to stay at 0 points, as Palotás's second win was by decision. Palotás was joined at 1 point by Kokkinen, who stayed at 1 point with a win by fall in this round. Two men had 2 points after each won two consecutive bouts by decision.

 Bouts

 Points

Round 3

None of the wrestlers had 0 points after this round; Johansson's win was by decision (moving him to 1 point) and Kokkinen lost by split decision (2 points). Palotás stayed at 1 point to join Johansson in the lead. Four wrestlers finished the round with 3 points. Three wrestlers received their second loss and were eliminated.

 Bouts

 Points

Round 4

Johansson and Palotás stayed at 1 point apiece with a win by fall and a bye, respectively. Kokkinen and Schweckert finished the round with 3 points each. The three losers in this round were eliminated; Cocos with his second loss, but Gallegati and Orabi each with only their first loss. Both men had won each of their first three bouts by decision and so had 3 points going into this round; one loss was enough for elimination. The official report assigns individual ranking through 6th place, leaving Orabi in 7th by default.

 Bouts

 Points

Round 5

Neither Palotás nor Johansson was threatened with elimination yet; Palotás lost to Schweickert to move from 1 point to 4 while Johansson prevailed by decision over Kokkinen to move to 2 points. Schweickert and Kokkinen each needed to win to continue, with Schweickert accomplishing that goal but Kokkinen falling.

 Bouts

 Points

Round 6

The only pairing among the three remaining wrestlers that had not been contested already was Johansson against Palotás (Johansson had defeated Schweickert, who had defeated Palotás). A Johansson win would give him the gold, Schweickert silver, and Palotás bronze. A Palotás win, however, would give Schweickert the gold, Palotás silver, and Johansson bronze—unless the win was by split decision, which would have reversed the silver and bronze, but still left Schweickert as the winner. Johansson defeated Palotás by fall, however, to win the gold medal.

 Bouts

 Points

References

Wrestling at the 1936 Summer Olympics